George's Day in Autumn, or Saint George's Day (or) is one of two feasts of Saint George, celebrated by the Russian Orthodox Church (26 November Julian Calendar, equivalent to 9 December Gregorian from 1900 to 2099), the Serbian Orthodox Church (3 November Julian Calendar, equivalent to 16 November Gregorian from 1900 to 2099), and the Georgian Orthodox Church (10 November Julian Calendar, equivalent to 23 November Gregorian from 1900 to 2099), the other being Saint George's Day of Spring (23 April Julian, equivalent to 6 May in the Gregorian calendar from 1900 to 2099).

Yuri's Day in the Autumn, celebrated after the end of the agricultural year and the gathering of the harvest, had a special significance on the calendar of Russian peasants during the centuries when the system of Russian serfdom was becoming established. The Sudebnik of 1497 defined the two weeks' period around the Autumn Yuri's Day (one week before the feast and one week after it), as the only time of the year when Russian peasants were free to move from one landowner to another. A century later, in 1597, Boris Godunov's regency forbade the movement of peasants on Yuri's day, thus finalizing the evolution of Russian serfdom.

A popular Russian expression harking back to that unfortunate event still survives ("вот тебе, бабушка, и Юрьев день", roughly translated: "so much for Yuri's Day, Granny", referring to a broken promise or, more generally, to any failed expectation). The Russian word "объегорить" (meaning to deceive or fool someone, literally, "to Yegor around", with Yegor) also being one of the variants of the name "George") has the same origin.

Đurđic is one of major Serbian Slava (patron saint) days.

See also 
 George's Day in Spring
 Saint George's Day

References 

Alexander Panchenko, Review of the book by Laura Stark, Peasants, Pilgrims, and Sacred Promises: Ritual and Supernatural in Orthodox Karelian Folk Religion

15th century in the Grand Duchy of Moscow
Serfdom

Eastern Orthodox liturgical days
Slavic holidays
Folk calendar of the East Slavs
1497 in Europe
Saint George's Day